Aftermath is a Canadian television drama series. The first season, consisting of 13 episodes, aired initially in September 2016 on Syfy in the United States and on Space in Canada. On January 12, 2017, Syfy and Space canceled the show after one season.

Plot
The series is centered on the Copeland family, a couple and their three young adult children, who struggle to survive as natural disasters, followed by the rise of supernatural beings, bring civilization to an end. The Copelands begin their journey in North Pasco, Washington and head towards Yakima in an RV, looking to survive such events as disastrous weather, unscrupulous humans, and supernatural freaks roaming the area.

Cast and characters

Main
 Anne Heche as Karen Copeland, a U.S. Air Force pilot with fighting skills
 James Tupper as Joshua Copeland, a world cultures professor who can analyze the changing world
 Levi Meaden as Matt Copeland, the eldest child
 Julia Sarah Stone as Dana Copeland, Brianna's brainy twin
 Taylor Hickson as Brianna Copeland, Dana's headstrong twin

Episodes

Reception
The A.V. Club criticized the show for a lack of character development, noting that "the Copeland family—Washington residents who find themselves caught up in a world falling apart—barely seem to like each other, let alone have any serious family bond."

References

External links
 Syfy website
 Space website
 

2010s Canadian drama television series
2016 Canadian television series debuts
2016 Canadian television series endings
English-language television shows
CTV Sci-Fi Channel original programming
Syfy original programming
Post-apocalyptic television series
Serial drama television series
Television series by Universal Content Productions